Kees Nierop (born 16 March 1958 in Purmerend, the Netherlands) is a former professional Dutch race car driver. He won the 1983 12 Hours of Sebring race while driving a Porsche 934.   He is also credited with being the only Canadian to have his name on a Porsche factory race car, which is displayed in the Porsche Museum located in Stuttgart, Germany.

References 

1958 births
Living people
People from Purmerend
Dutch racing drivers
12 Hours of Sebring drivers
Sportspeople from North Holland

Porsche Motorsports drivers